Wandzin  is a village in the administrative district of Gmina Lubartów, within Lubartów County, Lublin Voivodeship, in eastern Poland. Moreover Wandzin produce Easter palms.

The village has an approximate population of 220.

References

Wandzin